West Philadelphia, nicknamed West Philly, is a section of the city of Philadelphia. Alhough there are no officially defined boundaries, it is generally considered to reach from the western shore of the Schuylkill River, to City Avenue to the northwest, Cobbs Creek to the southwest, and the SEPTA Media/Wawa Line to the south. An alternate definition includes all city land west of the Schuylkill; this would also include Southwest Philadelphia and its neighborhoods.  The eastern side of West Philadelphia is also known as University City.

Topography

The topography of West Philadelphia is composed of rolling hills rising slowly from the Schuylkill River toward Cobbs Creek in the west and toward Belmont Plateau in the northwest. This gradual elevation makes the skyline of Center City visible from many points in West Philadelphia. The Wynnefield neighborhood is a location frequently used by photographers and organizers of civic events.

Demographics
According to the 2010 census, 216,433 people live among the ZIP codes of 19104, 19131, 19139, 19143 and 19151. (Map)

Racial demographics

 Non-Hispanic Black or African-American: 164,921 (76.2%)
 Non-Hispanic White/European: 37,010 (17.1%)
 Hispanic or Latino: 4,328 (2.0%)
 American Indian: 4,112 (1.9%)
 Asian: 3,246 (1.5%)
 Mixed or Other: 2,813 (1.3%)

Starting with the first wave of Irish immigrants in the early 19th century, West Philadelphia was home to large numbers of European immigrants and their descendants. The area's African American population began growing in the 1880s through the migration of blacks from the southern states; white flight in the early 1960s completed the transition to a majority-black population.

Since the 1980s, gentrification, immigration, and the Urban Indian relocation movement have brought more racial diversity. Arrivals from East Asia and Latin America, mainly Dominicans, Puerto Ricans, and Mexicans, have given the area  small Hispanic and Asian American populations. The community has a fair number of Afro-Caribbean/Caribbean American residents, from the Jamaica, Haiti, Barbados, and other areas of the West Indies, as well as a growing number of African immigrants.

History

The Woodlands Cemetery, which is located near the west bank of the Schuylkill River, was originally the estate of Andrew Hamilton who bought the property in 1735 from descendants of Blockley Township's founder, William Warner, who hailed from Brockley, England. Warner was the first known European west of the Schuylkill. In 1840, the property was transformed into a cemetery with an arboretum of over 1,000 trees.  It holds the graves of many famous Philadelphians.

Satterlee Hospital, one of the largest Union Army hospitals of the Civil War, operated from 1862 to 1865; part of its grounds are now the northern section of Clark Park.

West Philadelphia's population expanded in the late 19th and early 20th centuries, thanks in large part to horsecars, then streetcars, and Schuylkill River bridges that allowed middle-class breadwinners to commute into the Central Business District a few miles to the east. West Philadelphia was among the early streetcar suburbs, and a portion of it is listed on the National Register of Historic Places as the West Philadelphia Streetcar Suburb Historic District.

The western portion of the neighborhood was once home to some of the most expensive real estate in the country (and much striking Victorian-era architecture remains). The area has declined in prominence over the last 50 years, thanks in part to increasing crime and the migration of many middle and upper-class residents to suburbs and other sections of the city.

West Philadelphia drew national attention in 1978 and 1985 for violent clashes between police and an Afro-centric, back-to-nature group called MOVE. During the latter confrontation, police firebombed the group's headquarters, killing 11 people and destroying an entire block of Osage Avenue and Pine Street.

In recent years, parts of West Philadelphia have undergone "Penntrification," a term that reflects the University of Pennsylvania's role in gentrification of the neighborhood; including a campaign to rename part of the area University City (the designation now appears on maps as well as public street signs and government listings). Many young professionals and families have moved into the area.

In 2008, the area around the Please Touch Museum, Philadelphia Zoo, and the Mann Music Center was designated the Centennial District: an area to be revitalized by the country's 250th birthday in 2026.

Housing

Most of the houses in West Philadelphia are row houses, although there are areas of semi-detached and detached houses. The earliest developments began in 1850 and the final period of mass construction ended in 1930. Development was enabled by the creation of the horsecar, which pushed development to about 43rd Street, and, after the arrival of the electrified streetcar in 1892, accelerated to the west and southwest.  

Largely commissioned by speculative developers and designed by some of the city's most prolific architects, they were purchased by industrial managers and other professionals who led the first movement of upper and middle class from the more crowded city center. Developers found they could increase profits by catering to this emerging group, shrinking lot sizes, and building more compact, less ornate houses.

Initial development was divided into block lots and sold in 1852 with the condition that "substantial stone or brick buildings" be erected. The houses in this grouping are primarily three-story Italianate buildings, linked by material, decorative detail, and form. An additional but smaller and less ornate 16 Italianate, brownstone, semi-detached houses, similar in form to the initial houses, were built around Chester Avenue. The setback of these houses was 25 feet, allowing generous front yards.

Another development on Locust Street, a project by banker and West Philly resident Clarence Howard Clark, comprised three-story, two-bay, brick, restrained Queen Anne rowhouses. The street was unified by front yards, and enclosed by decorative iron fences. The houses melded the suburban principles of front porches and greenspace with the urban rowhouse form, producing profitable, yet desirable, middle-class suburban housing.

Other developments introduced urban density and architectural uniformity: the Queen Anne style with columned porches and decorative spindlework, brickwork and corbelling; steeply pitched gables with fishscale slate shingles; turrets; balconies; and windows with a single pane surrounded by small panes. These houses are typical of the early 20th-century developments in West Philadelphia, and are unified by rhythmic patterning of porch and gable features. The second story, projecting, semi-hexagonal bay is incorporated into this design, an element which defines the later rowhouses.

The western reaches of West Philadelphia included miles of two-story rowhouses with bay windows above classical columned front porches. What resulted was a collection of Colonial Revival houses with Arts and Crafts influences, which reflect the sophisticated tastes of post-World War I Philadelphians. For the first time in West Philadelphia, houses had garages. Later Tudor and Spanish Revival houses, and the Art Deco influenced apartment houses also filled in available lot spaces between developments and made it possible for more middle-class Philadelphians to move to the area.

Transportation

Elevated Rail

One of West Philadelphia's most prominent features is the "El", or SEPTA's Market-Frankford Line or Blue Line. Completed in 1907, this elevated subway line linked West Philadelphia, Millbourne and Upper Darby to Center City and then later to Frankford.

Running above and, for a portion, under Market Street, this transportation link is one of Philadelphia's two major transit lines that transport hundreds of thousands of students and workers daily into and around the city. The El once powered the economic engine of West Philadelphia.

Retail districts lined every street where there was a station as well as along Market Street. Most recently many of these retail districts with the exception of 52nd Street have been converted to largely residential areas. One of the aggravating factors in this change has been the recent reconstruction of the EL which, due to detours of the "number streets" or numbered north–south thoroughfares and closure of large portions of Market Street, have led to many remaining businesses failing.

Light rail

Another major transit link in West Philadelphia are the five Subway Surface Lines, often called the Green Lines for their representation on SEPTA route maps. These include five of Philadelphia's remaining six streetcar lines. Combined, these trolley routes convey more than 150,000 passengers daily, and operate 24-hour schedules, even in blizzards.

The Route 10 trolley runs along Lancaster Avenue from 63rd and Malvern Avenue through to 36th and Ludlow Streets where a portal allows access to the subway tunnel into Center City. The Route 34 trolley runs along Baltimore Avenue from Cobbs Creek at 61st Street to the transit tunnel at 40th Street in University City. The Route 13 trolley runs along Chester Avenue from the transit tunnel at 40th Street and Baltimore Avenue to 67th Street where it turns off Chester Avenue and continues along PA Route 13 into Yeadon, Delaware County on to its terminus at Green Lane.

The Route 11 trolley runs along Woodland Avenue from the transit tunnel at 40th Street to the city line at Cobbs Creek and continues into Darby Borough. Finally, the Route 36 trolley is the longest trolley Green Line service. The 36 trolley leaves the 40th Street transit tunnel running along Woodland Avenue until 49th Street where it turns south to continue along Lindbergh Boulevard turning at Elmwood Avenue starting at 55th Street. Route 36 terminates in Southwest Philadelphia at Island Avenue west and 73rd Street, near the Philadelphia International Airport.

Two other trolley lines originally ran through West Philly. The Route 38 trolley, running from Wynfield to Center City via Belmont Avenue, and the Route 31 trolley, running from Overbrook to Center City via Haverford Avenue, were replaced by diesel buses when the Philadelphia Transportation Company transferred control of the trolley service to National City Lines.

Regional rail

West Philadelphia is also served by five of SEPTA's thirteen Regional Rail Lines, which transport thousands of commuters daily to and from Center City and University City, and provide a quick and inexpensive link to the Philadelphia International Airport. [All 13 serve 30th Street Station on the edge of West Philadelphia.] The Airport Line serves University City at University City Station in the University of Pennsylvania, going on to southernmost Southwest Philadelphia and the airport. The Media/Wawa Line also serves University City and portions of Southwest Philadelphia before continuing to Media and points beyond.

The Paoli/Thorndale Line serves Overbrook and Wynnefield, and continues to the Main Line communities and Paoli. However, the Paoli/Thorndale does not stop anywhere between 30th Street and City Line Avenue, instead bypassing most of West Philadelphia ever since the closure of 52nd Street station. The Cynwyd Line is a limited-service express line from Center City to the Bala Cynwyd neighborhood of Lower Merion Township.

Most of these passenger trips originate outside of the city, but more West Philly residents are using SEPTA's multi-ride "Transpass", which allows unlimited rides on SEPTA vehicles within the city limits.

Community groups have called on SEPTA to reopen closed Regional Rail stations in areas further away from the Market-Frankford Line and the Broad Street Line.

Streets
West Philadelphia's streets are laid out in a modified grid. The main thoroughfare, Market Street, runs East and West, paralleled to the north and south by smaller streets named for tree species. North–south streets are numbered, rising consecutively from 30th Street at the Schuylkill River to 77th Street on the far western edge near Cobbs Creek and to the block-long 90th Street in Southwest Philadelphia near the airport.

The highest numbered street to run any considerable distance contiguously is 58th Street, which runs from the northern frontier of West Philadelphia at City Avenue south to the Schuylkill River. 77th and 86th Streets run just a few blocks before they leave the city for surrounding jurisdictions. (For example, 84th Street becomes Hook Road when it crosses into Sharon Hill.)  The 77th Street in Overbrook is not contiguous with the 77th Street in the column of streets that ends with 90th Street in Southwest Philadelphia.  The two 77th Streets (as well as all numbered streets after 58th) are miles apart.

The street grid ends at Cobbs Creek Park along with the western political boundary of Philadelphia, but many of the street names and a roughly similar street grid (it begins to degrade outside the city) continue beyond the city limits into Upper Darby Township, into which Market Street runs uninterrupted to 69th street at the El terminal, where it turns into West Chester Pike and runs through Delaware County and into Chester County.  With the exception of Market Street, these streets can be regarded as being "named after" the streets in West Philadelphia, not continuations, as they are cut off by the park. The numbering pattern is mixed; someone traveling along Market Street into Upper Darby would cross 62nd Street, then Cobbs Creek Parkway/63rd St, then several named streets until finally arriving at 69th Street, skipping 64–68.

Other major thoroughfares include Chestnut and Walnut Streets, which together form Pennsylvania Route 3. Every day, thousands of vehicles travel this route, which is one of the major commuter routes into and out of Philadelphia from Delaware and Chester Counties. In the 1960s and 1970s, illuminated signs announced what speed to drive to travel 4.3 miles into Center City without stopping for a red light. The streets were once lined with American Chestnut and walnut trees that touched across the five lanes of roadway, but many were removed due to Chestnut blight and replaced with a mix of sycamore and poplar trees. City officials found these species much more tolerant of the urban environment and resistant to disease. A handful of chestnut trees remain near Cobbs Creek.

Lancaster Avenue begins at 34th street near Drexel University; runs westward to the city line at City Avenue; and continues on as U.S. Route 30 to Lancaster, York, Pittsburgh. and the West Virginia border. One of the major retail strips in West Philadelphia, it is lined with shops and restaurants through to 64th Street in the Wynnefield neighborhood. In addition, one of Philadelphia's six streetcar lines, the Route 10 Green Line, transports commuters and students daily along Lancaster Avenue from 36th and Ludlow streets to 63rd and Malvern Avenue in Wynnefield.

Crime
The intersection of 52nd Street and Market Street in West Philadelphia was listed number eight in a 2007 list of the city's top ten recreational drug corners according to an article by Philadelphia Weekly reporter Steve Volk.

The Philadelphia Police Department divides West Philadelphia into four patrol districts: the 16th, 18th, 19th, and 92nd.

Schools

Primary and secondary schools

Public schools

The area's public schools are operated by the School District of Philadelphia.

West Philadelphia High School was one of the biggest and most diverse schools in state when it was opened in 1911. The students of "West" were the children of middle-class black people, as well as of Irish, Jewish, Polish and other immigrant groups.

Other high schools include University City High School; William L. Sayre High School, formerly Sayre Middle School; Robert E. Lamberton High School; Mastery Charter Shoemaker Campus, formerly William Shoemaker Middle School; and Overbrook High School.

Elementary schools include Morton McMichael Elementary School and Lea Elementary School. Harrity Elementary School is a district-owned school operated by Mastery Charter Schools.

Private schools
Blocks away from "West" were the West Philadelphia Catholic High Schools for Girls at 46th Street and Boys at 48th Street, now consolidated into West Catholic Preparatory High School in the building at 46th Street. St. Thomas More High School for Boys at 47th and Wyalusing Avenue was closed in 1975 and now houses the Sr Clara Muhammad School.

Colleges and universities
West Philadelphia is the home to several universities, including the University of Pennsylvania, Drexel University, the University of the Sciences in Philadelphia, and Saint Joseph's University.

Destinations
West Philadelphia has about 75 of Philadelphia's 196 blue historic markers, which note historically important birthplaces, homes, business and other places.

The nation's oldest zoological garden, the Philadelphia Zoo, has exhibitions and educational programs. Nestled in the center of Fairmount Park, it is near Memorial Hall, the current home of the Please Touch Museum, Kelly Pool, The Carousel House, and the new Microsoft partner high school, the "School of the Future"

Cultural venues include the Mann Music Center of the Performing Arts and the Bushfire Theater of the Performing Arts on 52nd Street.

West Philadelphia contains many places of worship.  These include mosques such as Masjid Al-Jamia, a Sunni Muslim institution at 4228 Walnut Street. Founded in the late 1980s, Masjid Al-Jamia is located in the former Commodore Theatre, a cinema which opened in 1928 and which was built in the Spanish Colonial or Moorish architectural style.

In media
The area gained some fame through the DJ Jazzy Jeff & the Fresh Prince song "Yo Home to Bel-Air", which became the theme song to the NBC sitcom The Fresh Prince of Bel-Air in which Wynnefield native Will Smith raps, "In West Philadelphia, born and raised...."

The NBC drama American Dreams is set in West Philadelphia in the mid-1960s.

West Philadelphia was also the home of American Bandstand, the popular dance show that launched the career of host Dick Clark and turned some local high school students into teen idols. The show was produced in Studio B of television station WFIL-TV (Channel 6, now WPVI-TV), located in the station's then-new addition at 4548 Market Street. The building, which still sports a large satellite dish on its roof, is now home to the West Philadelphia Enterprise Center.

Proposed developments 
As of early 2017, large proposed developments in West Philadelphia include the 30th Street Station District and Schuylkill Yards.

See also

National Register of Historic Places listings in West Philadelphia

References

External links

 University City Historical District - history of the area now known as West Philadelphia
 WestPhillyNews.com West Philly News - Local news & information. Home of the West Philly Forum, a community bulletin board.
 WestPhillyLocal.com West Philly Local - A local, independent website that covers West Philadelphia and University City.
 City government's West Philadelphia page: statistics, links
 West Philadelphia Community History Center - University of Pennsylvania
 Historical Maps of West Philadelphia, archived at U. Penn.
Lancaster Avenue photographs of Lancaster Avenue, West Philadelphia